Hans Sturzenegger (1875–1943) was a Swiss painter.

References
This article was initially translated from the German Wikipedia.

19th-century Swiss painters
Swiss male painters
20th-century Swiss painters
1875 births
1943 deaths
19th-century Swiss male artists
20th-century Swiss male artists